Thirumathi Palanisamy is a 1992 Indian Tamil-language comedy drama film written and directed by R. Sundarrajan. The film stars Sathyaraj and Sukanya. It was released on 25 October 1992.

Plot 

Palanisamy is an uneducated man who dreams to marry a teacher and lives with his friend Dhandapani. Palanisamy falls in love with Hamsaveni at first sight. He decides to go to her village Irugur. First reluctant, she finally agrees to marry him, but only under three conditions: to continue to work as a teacher, to live in her hometown and with her father. After the marriage, Palanisamy imposes her three conditions: she must leave her hometown, be a teacher in the city that he has chosen and leave her father. She accepts them and Palanisamy explains the reason for these conditions.

In the past, Palanisamy lived in a village where a don Aandhavar forced the children to work in his fireworks factory. Palanisamy's father was a doctor and tried to save the children; knowing it, Aandhavar killed him. Aandhavar also killed his sister for the only reason that she was educated. Palanisamy asked many teachers to come to his village but everyone refused for fear of Aandhavar. Palanisamy's only hope is now Hamsaveni. What transpires next forms the rest of the story.

Cast 

Sathyaraj as Palanisamy
Sukanya as Hamsaveni
Goundamani as Dhandapani
R. Sundarrajan as Kunju Gounder
Rekha (guest appearance)
Srividya
Nassar
Kovai Sarala as School Teacher and Salem Annakili
Babu Antony
Delhi Ganesh as Palanisamy's father
Kripa Shanker as Aandhavar
Pandu as House Owner
Mannangatti Subramaniam as Marimuthu Gounder
Typist Gopu
Balambika as Palanisamy's sister
Ganthimathi as Aandal
Kamala Kamesh
Ram-Lakshman
Karuppu Subbiah
Vellai Subbaiah
Tirupur Ramasamy
Joker Thulasi
Vikram Dharma in a cameo appearance
Rajendran
 Balu Anand as Kovil Pusari

Soundtrack 
The soundtrack was composed by Ilaiyaraaja, with lyrics written by Vaali and Gangai Amaran.

Release and reception 
Thirumathi Palanisamy was released on 25 October 1992, Diwali day. Malini Mannath of The Indian Express gave the film a mixed review citing that "the first half was highly enjoyable and humorous" and she criticised the latter part. C. R. K. of Kalki praised the director for the message of the film.

References

External links 

 

1990s Tamil-language films
1992 comedy-drama films
1992 films
Films about the education system in India
Films directed by R. Sundarrajan
Films scored by Ilaiyaraaja
Indian comedy-drama films